Richard Sheldon may refer to:

 Richard Sheldon (athlete) (1878–1935), American athlete and Olympian
 Richard Sheldon (controversialist) (died 1642), English clergyman

See also
 Richard Sheldon Palais (born 1931), American mathematician